Pozdnyakova is feminine counterpart of a Russian surname Pozdnyakov. Notable people with the surname include:

 Anastasia Yuryevna Pozdnyakova (born 1985), Russian diver
 Irina Valentinovna Pozdnyakova (born 1953), Russian swimmer
 Tetyana Vasylivna Pozdnyakova (born 1955), Ukrainian Soviet long-distance runner

 Also
 Pozdnyakova, Irkutsk Oblast, a village in Irkutsk Oblast
 Pozdnyakova, Kursk Oblast, a village in Oktyabrsky District of Kursk Oblast

Russian-language surnames